The Hard Hombre is a 1931 American pre-Code Western film directed by Otto Brower and starring rodeo champion Hoot Gibson. The film follows a simpleton rancher who is mistaken for a notorious outlaw known as The Hard Hombre.

Cast
Hoot Gibson as William Penn "Peaceful" Patton
Lina Basquette as Senora Martini
Mathilde Comont as Maria Romero
G. Raymond Nye as Joe Barlow
Jessie Arnold as Mrs. Patton
Christian J. Frank as Sheriff
Skeeter Bill Robbins as Slim
Frank Winkleman as The Hard Hombre

Production
Principal photography for The Hard Hombre began on July 14, 1931, where the opening scenes were filmed at Vasquez Rocks in Angeles National Forest. It is one of the first films to be filmed in part at the popular rock formation.

References

External links

1931 films
American black-and-white films
1931 Western (genre) films
American Western (genre) films
Films directed by Otto Brower
1930s English-language films
1930s American films